Norstedt (North Frisian: Noorst) is a municipality in the district of Nordfriesland, in Schleswig-Holstein, Germany.

External links

References

Municipalities in Schleswig-Holstein
Nordfriesland